Henry Lyman (Northampton, Massachusetts 23 November 1809–Sacca village, Lobu Pining, Tarutung, Sumatra 28 June 1834) was an American Baptist missionary murdered in Sumatra together with his colleague Samuel Munson.

His parents were Theodore Lyman and Susan Willard Whitney, his wife Eliza Pond. His sister, Hannah Lyman, was the first Lady-Principal of Vassar College.

References

External links
northsumatratravel.net biography

1809 births
1834 deaths
Baptist missionaries in Indonesia
People from Northampton, Massachusetts
People murdered in Indonesia
American people murdered abroad
American expatriates in Indonesia
19th-century Baptists